Duke of St Albans is a title in the Peerage of England. It was created in 1684 for Charles Beauclerk, 1st Earl of Burford, then 14 years old. King Charles II had accepted that Burford was his illegitimate son by Nell Gwyn, an actress, and awarded him the Dukedom just as he had conferred those of Monmouth, Southampton, Grafton, Northumberland and Richmond and Lennox on his other illegitimate sons who married.

The subsidiary titles of the Duke are: Earl of Burford, in the County of Oxford (1676), Baron Heddington, in the same (1676) and Baron Vere, of Hanworth in the County of Middlesex (1750). The Earldom and the Barony of Heddington are in the Peerage of England, and the Barony of Vere is in the Peerage of Great Britain. The Dukes hold the hereditary title of Grand Falconer of England, and of no effect Hereditary Registrar of the Court of Chancery.

By tradition, the Earldom and Vere barony are enjoyed as courtesy titles by the Duke's heir apparent and his heir apparent respectively.

Recent Dukes have not held a great estate nor stately home. Late twentieth century seats were Bestwood Lodge in Nottinghamshire, which was originally the property of the 1st Duke's mother, the celebrated actress and mistress to Charles II Nell Gwyn, and which is now a hotel, and Upper Gatton Park in Surrey.

The accepted pronunciation of Beauclerk is reflected in frequent early renderings Beauclaire: .

Dukes of St Albans (1684)

Other titles: Earl of Burford, in the county of Oxford, and Baron Heddington, in the county of Oxford (1676)
Charles Beauclerk, 1st Duke of St Albans (1670–1726) (elder illegitimate son of Charles II and Nell Gwynn)
Charles Beauclerk, 2nd Duke of St Albans (1696–1751) (eldest son of the 1st Duke)
George Beauclerk, 3rd Duke of St Albans (1720–1786) (only son of the 2nd Duke, died without issue)
George Beauclerk, 4th Duke of St Albans (1758–1787) (grandson of Lord William Beauclerk, second son of the 1st Duke, died unmarried)
Other titles (5th Duke onwards): Baron Vere, of Hanworth in the county of Middlesex (1750)
Aubrey Beauclerk, 5th Duke of St Albans (1740–1802) (fourth and youngest son of Vere Beauclerk, 1st Baron Vere, himself third son of the 1st Duke)
Aubrey Beauclerk, 6th Duke of St Albans (1765–1815) (eldest son of the 5th Duke)
Aubrey Beauclerk, 7th Duke of St Albans (1815–1816) (only son of the 6th Duke, died in infancy)
William Beauclerk, 8th Duke of St Albans (1766–1825) (second son of the 5th Duke)
William Aubrey de Vere Beauclerk, 9th Duke of St. Albans (1801–1849) (eldest son of the 8th Duke)
William Amelius Aubrey de Vere Beauclerk, 10th Duke of St Albans (1840–1898) (only son of the 9th Duke)
Charles Victor Albert Aubrey de Vere Beauclerk, 11th Duke of St Albans (1870–1934) (eldest son of the 10th Duke, died without issue)
Osborne de Vere Beauclerk, 12th Duke of St Albans (1874–1964) (second son of the 10th Duke, died without issue)
Charles Frederick Aubrey de Vere Beauclerk, 13th Duke of St Albans (1915–1988) (grandson of Lord Charles Beauclerk, fifth son of the 8th Duke)
Murray de Vere Beauclerk, 14th Duke of St Albans (b. 1939) (eldest son of the 13th Duke)

The heir apparent is Charles Francis Topham de Vere Beauclerk, Earl of Burford (b. 1965) (only son of the 14th Duke).

The heir apparent's heir in line is his only son, James Malcolm Aubrey Edward de Vere Beauclerk, Lord Vere (b. 1995).

Barons Vere (1750)
Vere Beauclerk, 1st Baron Vere (1699–1781) (third son of the 1st Duke)
Aubrey Beauclerk, 2nd Baron Vere (1740–1802) (succeeded as 5th Duke of St Albans in 1787)
for subsequent Barons Vere see Dukes of St Albans above

Current line of succession

 Charles Beauclerk, 1st Duke of St Albans (1670–1726)
 Vere Beauclerk, 1st Baron Vere (1699–1781)
 Aubrey Beauclerk, 5th Duke of St Albans (1740–1802)
 William Beauclerk, 8th Duke of St Albans (1766–1825)
Lord Charles Beauclerk (1813–1861)
Aubrey Topham Beauclerk (1850–1933)
 Charles Beauclerk, 13th Duke of St Albans (1915–1988)
 Murray Beauclerk, 14th Duke of St Albans (born 1939)
(1). Charles Francis Topham de Vere Beauclerk, Earl of Burford (b. 1965) 
(2). James Malcolm Aubrey Edward de Vere Beauclerk, Lord Vere (b. 1995)
(3). Lord Peter Charles de Vere Beauclerk (b. 1948)
(4). Lord James Charles Fesq de Vere Beauclerk (b. 1949) 
(5). Lord John William Aubrey de Vere Beauclerk (b. 1950) 
Lord Sidney Beauclerk (1703–1744)
Topham Beauclerk (1739–1780)
Charles George Beauclerk (1774–1845)
male-line descendants in line

Arms

Family tree

See also
 Duchess of St Albans

Notes

References

Charles Kidd & David Williamson (ed.), Debrett's Peerage and Baronetage (1990 edition), New York: St Martin's Press, 1990,

Further reading
Donald Adamson and Peter Beauclerk Dewar, The House of Nell Gwyn. The Fortunes of the Beauclerk Family, 1670-1974, London: William Kimber, 1974

Dukedoms in the Peerage of England
1684 establishments in England
Noble titles created in 1684